Jillian DeCoursey (born July 26, 1984) is an American mixed martial artist. She currently competes in the atomweight division of the Invicta FC, where she is the current atomweight champion.

As of November 21, 2022, Sherdog ranks DeCoursey as the #4 atomweight in the world.

Background
DeCoursey was born and grew up in Queens, New York, United States. DeCoursey started undergraduate studies at University of Bridgeport and graduated from Hunter College. She started Jiu-Jitsu after she finished competing in collegiate basketball at Hunter College. She later picked up Muay Thai and eventually transitioned to mixed martial arts. 

DeCoursey also eventually finished her postgraduate studies at Iona University, earning a master's degree and owns her counselling practice in mental health.

Mixed martial arts career

Early career 
DeCoursey was signed by Invicta after amassing an amateur record of 8–1. She was an IBJJF brown belt medalist.

Invicta Fighting Championships 
DeCoursey made her promotional debut on August 31, 2017 at Invicta FC 25: Kunitskaya vs. Pa'aluhi against Ashley Medina. She won the fight via split decision.

Her next fight came on March 24, 2018 at Invicta FC 28: Mizuki vs. Jandiroba against Rebekah Levine. She won the fight  via unanimous decision.

On July 21, 2018, DeCoursey faced Alesha Zappitella, replacing Shino VanHoose, at Invicta FC 30: Frey vs. Grusander.

For her next fight, DeCoursey fought outside of Invicta, being scheduled to face Katie Perez at CFFC 80. She won the fight by a third-round technical knockout.

DeCoursey returned to Invicta to face Linda Mihalec at Invicta FC 39: Frey vs. Cummins II. DeCoursey won the fight by unanimous decision.

DeCoursey was scheduled to challenge the reigning Cage Fury FC Strawweight champion Elise Reed at CFFC 91. Reed won the fight by unanimous decision.

DeCoursey was scheduled to participate in a one-night Invicta Phoenix Tournament to determine the next atomweight title challenger. DeCoursey lost the quarterfinal bout against Linda Mihalec by split decision.

DeCoursey faced Lindsey VanZandt on May 11, 2022 at Invicta FC 47. She won the bout after knocking out VanZandt in the first round.

Invicta FC Atomweight Champion
DeCoursey was booked to challenge the reigning Invicta Atomweight champion Jéssica Delboni at Invicta FC 49: Delboni vs. DeCoursey on September 28, 2022. DeCoursey won the fight by a first-round submission.

DeCoursey is scheduled to defends the title against Rayanne Dos Santos on May 3, 2023, at Invicta FC 53: DeCoursey vs. Dos Santos.

Professional grappling career
DeCoursey was invited to compete in the flyweight division of the Combat Jiu-Jitsu world championship on December 20, 2020. She withdrew from the event.

DeCoursey is scheduled to compete in a superfight at Rise Invitational 11 on April 1, 2023 against Chelsea Mapa.

Championships and accomplishments

Mixed Martial Arts 

 Invicta Fighting Championships
 Invicta FC Atomweight Championship (One time, current)

Mixed martial arts record 

|-
|Win
|align=center| 6–3
|Jéssica Delboni
|Submission (rear-naked choke)
|Invicta FC 49: Delboni vs. DeCoursey
|
|align=center|1
|align=center|4:49
|Hinton, Oklahoma, United States
|
|-
|Win
|align=center| 5–3
|Lindsey VanZandt
|KO (punch)
|Invicta FC 47: Ducote vs. Zappitella
|
|align=center|1
|align=center|1:01
|Kansas City, Kansas, United States
|
|-
| Loss
| align=center| 4–3
| Elise Reed
| Decision (unanimous)
| Cage Fury Fighting Championships 91
| 
| align=center| 4
| align=center|5:00
| Lancaster, Pennsylvania, United States
| 
|-
| Win
| align=center| 4–2
| Linda Mihalec
| Decision (unanimous)
| Invicta FC 39: Frey vs. Cummins II
| 
| align=center| 3
| align=center|5:00
| Kansas City, Kansas, United States
|
|-
| Win
| align=center| 3–2
| Katie Perez
| TKO (punches)
| Cage Fury Fighting Championships 80
| 
| align=center| 3
| align=center| 3:00
| Hampton, Virginia, United States
|
|-
| Loss
| align=center| 2–2
| Kelly D'Angelo
| Decision (unanimous)
| Invicta FC 35: Bennett vs. Rodriguez II
| 
| align=center| 3
| align=center|5:00
| Kansas City, Missouri, United States
|
|-
| Loss
| align=center| 2–1
| Alesha Zappitella
| Decision (unanimous)
| Invicta FC 30: Frey vs. Grusander
| 
| align=center| 3
| align=center|5:00
| Kansas City, Missouri, United States
|
|-
| Win
| align=center| 2–0
| Rebekah Levine
| Decision (unanimous)
| Invicta FC 28: Mizuki vs. Jandiroba
| 
| align=center| 3
| align=center|5:00
| Salt Lake City, Utah, United States
|
|-
| Win
| align=center| 1–0
| Ashley Medina
| Decision (split)
|Invicta FC 25: Kunitskaya vs. Pa'aluhi
| 
| align=center| 3
| align=center|5:00
| Lemoore, California, United States
|
|-

See also 
 List of female mixed martial artists

References

External links 
 
 Jillian DeCoursey at Invicta FC
 
 
 

1984 births
Living people
American female mixed martial artists
Atomweight mixed martial artists
Mixed martial artists utilizing Muay Thai
Mixed martial artists utilizing kickboxing
Mixed martial artists utilizing Brazilian jiu-jitsu
American Muay Thai practitioners
Female Muay Thai practitioners
American practitioners of Brazilian jiu-jitsu
Female Brazilian jiu-jitsu practitioners
People awarded a black belt in Brazilian jiu-jitsu
21st-century American women